The Highlands Army Air Defense Site (HAADS) was a United States Army air defence site in Middletown Township, New Jersey.

The Army Air Defense Command Post (AADCP) at Highlands directed the Nike fire units in the New York Defense Area, replacing the Nike missile "manual operations center" at Fort Wadsworth on Staten Island. The Missile Master Army Installation was built in the former Highlands Air Force Station and cost ~$2 million for the new equipment (Martin AN/FSG-1 and AN/FPS-6 & AN/FPS-90 height-finders) and ~$2 million for additional structures such as the  nuclear bunker, four radar towers, diesel power plant, and  cinderblock electrical switch building. Isaac Degeneers Construction Co. was the general contractor for the $1.71M construction (C. W. Regan was the lowest bidder at $1.5M).

The Army assumed control of the Highlands Air Force Station after the DoD had announced its closure for July 1966. The 646th Radar  Squadron was inactivated on July 1, 1966. The first Hughes AN/TSQ-51 Air Defense Command and Coordination System in the nation as activated at the HAADS.  The AADCP became the direction center for the combined New York-Philadelphia Defense Area when the AADCP near Philadelphia was closed in September 1966.  AADCP operations ended in 1974 under Project Concise in conjunction with the region's 9 remaining Nike fire units closing in April at Orangeburg/Mount Nebo, New York (NY-03/04), Amityville/Farmingdale, New York (NY-24), Fort Tilden (NY-49), Livingston, New Jersey (NY-79/80), Lumberton, New Jersey (PH-23/25), Erial, New Jersey (PH-41/43), and Woolwich Township, New Jersey (PH-58).

The Highlands Army Air Defense Site was decommissioned on October 31, 1974. The U.S. Department of Agriculture had made plans to put an animal quarantine station on the site in the early 1970s when the Highlands Army Air Defense Site was declared excess by the General Services Administration. The Monmouth County board of Freeholders was opposed to the plan. Representative James J. Howard (D-NJ) was instrumental in getting the Highlands Army Air Defense Site turned into a park in 1973 with the acquisition of 161 acres of the site property. Ten years later the GSA turned 63 acres of the operations area was turned over to the Monmouth County Park System. On July 3, 1984, the Monmouth County Park System signed for the deed to the remaining land.

The Highlands Missile Master building was demolished in 1995.

Garrison 
 52nd Artillery Brigade (1960–1963, 1967–1973)
 19th Air Defense Artillery Group (1961–1968)
 Headquarters and Headquarters Battery 1st Battalion, 51st Air Defense Artillery Regiment (1971–1973)
 Headquarters and Headquarters Battery 3rd Battalion, 51st Air Defence Artillery Regiment (1964–1968)
 16th Air Defense Artillery Group (1971–1974)

References

Further reading 
 "Middletown, NJ In The 20th Century"(The American Century Series) [Paperback] Randall Gabrielan (Author) Paperback: 128 pagesPublisher: Arcadia Pub (August 24, 1999) Language: English   See page: 106
 See: 
 See:  Opinion piece on page 6 "County needs those 161 acres"
 See: http://209.212.22.88/Data/RBR/1980-1989/1984/1984.09.21.pdf Red Bank Register article "GSA turns over park to county" Page A1 and A11
 See: Red Bank Register article Monmouth receives old air defense site land page B5
 See: 
 See: ; and see page 101 of the "Department of the Army Historical Summary: FY 1974" chapter 9
U.S. Army Nike sites
Middletown Township, New Jersey
Military installations in New Jersey
Buildings and structures in Monmouth County, New Jersey
Military installations established in 1960
1958 establishments in New Jersey
Military installations closed in 1974